Prince Tommaso of Savoy, 2nd Duke of Genoa (Tommaso Alberto Vittorio; 6 February 1854 – 15 April 1931), who is also known as Thomas Albert Victor of Savoy, was an Italian royal prince, nephew of Victor Emmanuel at the time the King of Sardinia, who on 18 February 1861 became the first King of a united Italy. His cousin and brother-in-law Umberto I and his nephew Victor Emmanuel III became subsequent kings of Italy.

Biography
Prince Thomas was born in Turin as the second child and only son of Prince Ferdinand of Savoy, 1st Duke of Genoa, the second son of Charles Albert, King of Sardinia (1798–1849, abdicated 1848) and his wife Maria Theresa of Austria-Tuscany (1801–55). Prince Thomas' mother was Princess Elisabeth of Saxony (1830–1912), daughter of King John I of Saxony (1801–73) and Princess Amalie of Bavaria (1801–77). Barely a year after his birth, on 10 February 1855, his father died and Prince Thomas inherited his title, becoming the 2nd Duke of Genoa. He was educated at Harrow.

With the accession of Victor Emmanuel II to the throne of Italy in 1861, Prince Tommaso, in common with all of the family members, became a prince of Italy.

During World War I the king, Victor Emanuel III, assumed the duties of Supreme Commander of the Armed Forces  and named the Duke of Genoa as Luogotenente, in which position he managed the civil affairs of the kingdom throughout the war.

Prince Thomas' elder sister Princess Margherita of Savoy-Genoa (1851–1926) married King Umberto I of Italy. Her only child was King Victor Emmanuel III of Italy, who reigned starting from his father's murder in 1900.

Prince Thomas died in 1931, leaving six adult children. He was the last surviving grandchild of Charles Albert of Sardinia.

Family and children
In 1883 at Nymphenburg, Bavaria, he was married to Princess Maria Isabella of Bavaria (1863–1924), the eldest daughter of the late Prince Adalbert of Bavaria (1828–1875) and Infanta Amalia of Spain (1834–1905), daughter of the Duke of Cadiz.

Their marriage produced the following children:

Honours
 : Knight of the Order of the Rue Crown, 1871
 :
 Knight of the Supreme Order of the Most Holy Annunciation, 2 June 1872
 Grand Cross of the Order of Saints Maurice and Lazarus, 2 June 1872
 Grand Cross of the Order of the Crown of Italy, 2 June 1872
 : Grand Cross of the Royal Hungarian Order of St. Stephen, 1875
  Kingdom of Prussia:
 Knight of the Order of the Black Eagle, 22 October 1875
 Grand Commander's Cross of the Royal House Order of Hohenzollern, 17 May 1893
 : Grand Cordon of the Supreme Order of the Chrysanthemum, 8 December 1879
 : Knight of the Order of St. Hubert, 1883
 :
 Grand Cross of the Royal and Distinguished Order of Charles III, 5 September 1887; with Collar, 15 May 1902
 Knight of the Order of the Golden Fleece, 6 February 1888
  Siam: Knight of the Most Illustrious Order of the Royal House of Chakri, 14 May 1897
 : Honorary Knight Grand Cross of the Royal Victorian Order, 30 April 1903

Ancestry

Notes and references

1854 births
1931 deaths
People educated at Harrow School
Nobility from Turin
Princes of Savoy
Italian people of Polish descent
Italian people of German descent
Dukes of Genoa
Italian princes
Italian admirals
Burials at the Basilica of Superga
Recipients of the Order of the Crown (Italy)
Knights Grand Cross of the Order of Saints Maurice and Lazarus
Knights of the Golden Fleece of Spain
Honorary Knights Grand Cross of the Royal Victorian Order
Grand Crosses of the Order of Saint Stephen of Hungary